The 2002 Cup of Russia was the fifth event of six in the 2002–03 ISU Grand Prix of Figure Skating, a senior-level international invitational competition series. It was held at the Luzhniki Small Sports Arena in Moscow on November 22–24. Medals were awarded in the disciplines of men's singles, ladies' singles, pair skating, and ice dancing. Skaters earned points toward qualifying for the 2002–03 Grand Prix Final.

Results

Men

Ladies

Pairs

Ice dancing

External links
 2002 Cup of Russia

Cup Of Russia, 2002
Cup of Russia
Rostelecom Cup